Banana ketchup (or banana sauce) is a popular Philippine fruit ketchup condiment made from banana, sugar, vinegar, and spices. Its natural color is brownish-yellow but it is often dyed red to resemble tomato ketchup. Banana ketchup was first produced in the Philippines during World War II due to a wartime shortage of tomatoes but a comparatively high production of bananas.

Use 
In Filipino households, this condiment is used on many assorted dishes: Filipino spaghetti, omelettes (torta), hot dogs, hamburgers, french fries, fish, charcoal-grilled pork barbecue and chicken skewers, fried chicken, and other meats.

History
Filipina food technologist Maria Y. Orosa (1892–1945) is credited with inventing the product.

In 1942, banana ketchup was first mass-produced commercially by Magdalo V. Francisco Sr. who founded the brand name Mafran (a portmanteau of his given name and surname) which he registered with the Bureau of Patents. Francisco sought funding from Tirso T. Reyes to expand his business and therefore the Universal Food Corporation (UFC) was formed in 1960.

See also

 Liver spread
 List of banana dishes
 List of condiments
 List of sauces
 Mushroom ketchup

References 

Banana dishes
Ketchup
Philippine condiments